Villabate (Sicilian: Villabbati) is a comune (municipality) in the Metropolitan City of Palermo in the Italian region Sicily, located about  southeast of Palermo.

Villabate borders the following municipalities: Ficarazzi, Misilmeri, Palermo.

Notable people
 Mafia boss and founder of Colombo crime family Joe Profaci (1897 - 1962)
 Athlete  Luigi Zarcone  (1950 - 2001)
 Blessed priest Vittorio Salmeri (1922 - 1954) 
 Mafia's victim Vincenzo Sansone ( M. 1947)

Demographic evolution

References

Municipalities of the Metropolitan City of Palermo